Asha Rao is a mathematician and expert in cyber security. She is the Associate Dean, or Head of Department, of Mathematical Sciences and Professor at RMIT University.

Education and career 
Asha Rao completed her PhD in Algebra at the University of Pune. She joined RMIT University as a casual tutor and has risen to her current leadership role on the strengths of her sustained contribution to higher education teaching and curriculum design in mathematics and cybersecurity, as well as her trans-disciplinary research expertise applying mathematics to solve real world problems for a range of industry partners including the Department of Defence. Professor Rao is the Founding Chair of Women In Mathematics and her leadership and advocacy for women in STEM has been recognised by the award of RMIT STEM Athena Swan Award.

Selected works 
Rao has authored more than 60 refereed scientific publications and contributed chapters to two scholarly books.

Highlights include influential academic contributions in the cyber security space as well as science communication outreach advocating for the importance of mathematics in high profile media platforms such as the Australian Financial Review and The Conversation.

Awards and recognition 
Rao has been recognised by numerous awards including:

2021 Australia India Science, Research & Development Award, India and Australia Business and Community Alliance

2021 Victorian Honour Roll of Women Trailblazer

2019 Superstars of STEM, Science and Technology Australia

2016 RMIT Media Stars Award

References 

Living people
Academic staff of RMIT University
Year of birth missing (living people)
Savitribai Phule Pune University alumni
21st-century women mathematicians
Computer security specialists
21st-century Australian mathematicians